Shop of Dreams is a 2005 Estonian drama film directed by Peeter Urbla. It was selected as the Estonian entry for the Best Foreign Language Film at the 78th Academy Awards, but it was not nominated.

Cast
 Maarja Jakobson as Alice
 Anne Reemann as Ada
 Evelin Võigemast as Jana
 Karol Kuntsel as Ivar
 Meelis Rämmeld as Andres
 Madis Kalmet as Edgar
 Marika Vaarik as Silvia
 Hannes Prikk as Bergvald

See also
 List of submissions to the 78th Academy Awards for Best Foreign Language Film
 List of Estonian submissions for the Academy Award for Best International Feature Film

References

External links
 

2005 films
2005 drama films
Estonian drama films
Estonian-language films